Princess Durru Shehvar Children's & General Hospital (PDSCGH) is a non-government and non-profit hospital in Hyderabad, Telangana, India. The hospital, which is named after Durru Shehvar, Princess of Berar and Imperial Princess of the Ottoman Empire, was established in 1989 to provide medical care to pre and post natal care to pregnant women and medical care facilities to children. To provide affordable health care to the general public medical services are subsidized by the government to make the healthcare more affordable and accessible to all sections of the society. The hospital later expanded its services to become a general hospital. The hospital is run by the Princess Durru Shehvar Children's Medical Aid Society.

Presently a surgeon Dr.S.V.Masood is Medical Superintendent and Administrator.

Facility and care
It has a 200-bed capacity as well as an 8-bed pediatric intensive care unit (PICU) with a neonatal intensive care unit (NICU) equipped with neonatal ventilators, phototherapy units and centralized cardiac monitors.

Areas of care include:
Dental surgery
Cardiology (non-interventional)
Gastroenterology
General surgery
Internal medicine
Orthopedic and fracture treatment
Otolaryngology
Ophthalmology
Pediatrics, pediatric surgery
Plastic and re-constructive surgery
Physiotheraphy
Reproductive health (gynecology and obstetrics)
Urology

See also
Osmania General Hospital
Niloufer Hospital

External links
Princess Durru Shehvar Children's & General Hospital website

Children's hospitals in India
Hospitals in Hyderabad, India
Hospitals established in Hyderabad State